Melpulam is a small village near Kalavai, in Vellore District of Tamil Nadu, one of the popular southern states of Modern India.

Villages in Vellore district